The Breakaway class is a class of cruise ships owned and operated by Norwegian Cruise Line and Dream Cruises. This class is an original design, and has two sub-classes. Although most ships of the class have subtle changes between one another, they all have the same general design. The first ship of the class, launched in 2013.

Ships

References

External links
 

Cruise ship classes
Norwegian Cruise Line